Tête de veau (French 'calf's head') or testina di vitello (Italian) is a dish consisting of a calf's head, commonly found in French, Belgian, German, Swiss, and Italian cuisine.

Tête de veau may be served whole or boned. When boned, it is rolled and held together with string. It is usually poached, but it may also be roasted. It may be served hot or cold, often with a vinaigrette or ravigote sauce. Cold, it may be served in slices.

A well-known dish in Belgium is "tête de veau en tortue" ('as a tortoise/turtle'), served with tomato sauce with Madeira and accompanied by French fries. This may be linked with English mock turtle soup, known in Lower Saxony as Mockturtle, a soup made from calf's head prepared and seasoned to resemble green turtle soup.

See also
 Head cheese

References

French cuisine
Belgian cuisine
Testina di vitello
German cuisine
Swiss cuisine
Beef dishes
Brain dishes